Daniel Huwyler (born 1 February 1963) is a Swiss former cyclist. He competed in the team pursuit event at the 1984 Summer Olympics.

References

External links
 

1963 births
Living people
Sportspeople from Aargau
Swiss male cyclists
Olympic cyclists of Switzerland
Cyclists at the 1984 Summer Olympics